"Focus Phrase" is a term traditionally used in cognitive-therapy and awareness-management discussions, and now in more general use to describe elicitor statements that evoke a desired refocusing of attention. Psychologically related terms are elicitor phrase or statement of intent.

The psychological term "Focus Phrase" is now used by therapists and life coaches as a general term.

Definition

"Focus phrase" is defined as "a specially-constructed short sentence or phrase that states a person's inner intent to refocus his or her attention immediately in a new pre-ordained direction".

Based both on new research in cognitive science and on cognitive-shifting studies of ancient meditation techniques (see Jon Kabat-Zinn), focus phrases have been used as a meditative tool and therapy aid, and are being introduced as at-work attentive boosts. They are carefully designed by professionals to almost instantly redirect the mind's attention specifically toward worthwhile sensations, thoughts, images, and other mental experiences. Focus phrases are highly effective in evoking rapid shifts in mental content, quality of awareness, sensory perception, and general inner experience. Therefore, they are considered of high value in meditative methods, and even in creativity-boost techniques.

Traditional cognitive therapy usage

As explained by the founder of cognitive therapy, Aaron Beck, our chronic thoughtflows (stream of consciousness) tend to dominate our inner experience and stimulate our behavior and emotions. If we want to change our inner experience (for instance from a negative mood to a more positive mood) we need to take charge of the thoughts we are holding in our minds, and state our intent to shift into a preferable mood or quality of consciousness. 

The theory of cognitive therapy teaches that the power of the spoken word in stating one's intent is primary for manifestation of one's intent. In ancient times, the Creation myth found in Genesis of the Old Testament relates that "God said let there be light, and there was light." Perhaps "Let there be light" was the primary focus phrase for our universe. And throughout anthropology studies, a verbal statement of intent (a blessing; a curse) was considered a decisive act in manifesting that intent.

Business applications

In corporate awareness-training, focus phrases are used not to change the outer world, but to rapidly shift inner attention, and thus alter personal experience and behavior. For instance, in order to shift rapidly from being lost in thought to present-moment alertness, the following core focus phrase drawn both from perceptual psychology and ancient Yoga meditative tradition is used: "I feel the air flowing in and out of my nose." Immediately, as often explained by spiritual teacher Alan Watts in his numerous books, the words have the psychological power to turn your attention toward the actual breathing experience - which in turn awakens your awareness to sensory experience in the present moment.

Elicitor statements using this general 'focus phrase technology' for mental refocusing can be used to redirect attention toward a more positive mood ("I let go of my worries, and feel peaceful inside"), toward more creative states of mind ("I am open to receive insight into my dilemma"), toward interpersonal relating ("I accept this person just as they are"), or toward any other intent to improve one's experience and behavior.

The term Focus Phrase is recently becoming a more general-usage term found in daily communication, referring to any short sentence intended to help a person's performance or inner experience. There is also some negative discussion of the term. In the opposite direction, the term Focus Phrase has been studied academically as a part of a Semantics dissertation.

See also

 Mindfulness Therapy
 Acceptance and Commitment Therapy

References

Cognitive science
New Age
Business terms